The Chushikoku Open is a golf tournament which was on the Japan Golf Tour from 1973 to 1991. It was first played in 1971.

Winners
this list is incomplete
2021 Yuki Ishikawa
2020 Katsufumi Okino
2019 Yasuki Hiramoto
2018 Yuki Kono
2017 Taro Hiroi
2016 Takashi Kanemoto
2015 Toshiki Ishitoku (amateur)
2014 Masayuki Omiya
2013 Satoru Hirota
2012 Masayuki Kawamura
2011 Ryutaro Kato (amateur´)
2010 Masayuki Sunairi
2009 Masayuki Kawamura
2008 Hiroki Yoshikawa
2007 Daisuke Kataoka (amateur)
2006 Takeshi Yasukawa
2005 Makoto Sueoka
2004 Shigeru Harimoto
2003
2002
2001 Takashi Kanemoto
2000 Takashi Kanemoto
1999 Hirooki Kokkawa
1998 Yoshikazu Sakamoto
1997 Hidezumi Shirakata
1996 Yosuke Tamaru
1995 Yoshikazu Sakamoto
1994 Hidezumi Shirakata
1993 Yoshikazu Sakamoto
1992 Masayuki Kawamura
1991 Kosei Miyata
1990 Seiki Okuda
1989 Tadami Ueno
1988 Masahiro Kuramoto
1987 Masahiro Kuramoto
1986 Tadami Ueno
1985 Mitoshi Tomita
1984 Masahiro Kuramoto
1983 Masahiro Kuramoto
1982 Masahiro Kuramoto
1981 Masahiro Kuramoto
1980 Masahiro Kuramoto (amateur)
1979 Hideto Shigenobu
1978 Seiji Katayama
1977 Tadami Ueno
1976 Tadami Ueno
1975 Tadami Ueno
1974 Mitsuhiko Masuda
1973 Mitsuhiko Masuda
1972
1971

External links
Coverage on Japan Golf Tour's official site

Former Japan Golf Tour events
Golf tournaments in Japan
Recurring sporting events established in 1971